Murowana may refer to the following places in Poland:

Murowana Goślina
Garlica Murowana
Lipnica Murowana
Miedzna Murowana
Wola Murowana